Nimblefish is a sushi restaurant in Portland, Oregon.

Description 
Nimblefish is a sushi restaurant in southeast Portland's Hosford-Abernethy neighborhood.

History 
Chefs Cody Auger and Dwight Rosendahl opened Nimblefish in December 2017. Brooke Jackson-Glidden of Eater Portland said Auger "has taken Japanese dishes and techniques and incorporated Pacific Northwestern ingredients".

Reception 
Matthew Korfhage of Willamette Week said the restaurant serves "some of the most excellent fish you'll ever find in Portland". The Portland Mercury's Benjamin Tepler said Nimblefish "helps fill a gaping hole in Portland’s restaurant scene". The restaurant was nominated for Bon Appétit's 50 best new restaurants in 2018. The magazine ranked Nimblefish number 6 in the "Hot 10" list.

See also 

 History of the Japanese in Portland, Oregon
 List of sushi restaurants

References

External links
 

2017 establishments in Oregon
Hosford-Abernethy, Portland, Oregon
Japanese restaurants in Portland, Oregon
Restaurants established in 2017
Sushi restaurants in the United States
Seafood restaurants in Portland, Oregon